Brown Line may refer to:
 Brown line, a process defined as siderotype, a monochrome printing process
 Brown Line (CTA), Chicago
 Brown Line (Delhi Metro), Delhi, India
 Brown Line (Pittsburgh), Pittsburgh, Pennsylvania
 Bakerloo line, London, United Kingdom
 BMT Nassau Street Line, a rapid transit line in New York City
 J/Z (New York City Subway service)
 Tangerang Line of KRL Commuterline, Jakarta, Indonesia
 Paris Métro Line 11, Paris, France
 Thomson–East Coast line, Singapore
 Tuen Ma line, Hong Kong, China
 U5 (Berlin U-Bahn), Berlin, Germany
 Wenhu line, Taipei, Taiwan